The 1894 Hendon Rural District Council election took place in December 1894 to elect members of Hendon Rural District Council in London, England. The council had been created under the Local Government Act 1894, and the whole council was up for election.

Election result

References

1894
Hendon
1894 English local elections
December 1894 events